The 2011 Judo Grand Prix Baku was held in Baku, Azerbaijan from 6 to 8 May 2011.

Medal summary

Men's events

Women's events

Source Results

Medal table

References

External links
 

2011 IJF World Tour
2011 Judo Grand Prix
Judo
Grand Prix Baku 2011
Judo
Judo